Thomas Brooks (1608–1680) was an English non-conformist Puritan preacher and author.

Life 

Much of what is known about Thomas Brooks has been ascertained from his writings. Born in 1608, likely to wealthy parents, Brooks entered Emmanuel College, Cambridge in 1625, where he was preceded by such men as Thomas Hooker, John Cotton, and Thomas Shepard.  He was licensed as a preacher of the gospel by 1640.  Before that date, he appears to have spent several years at sea, probably as a chaplain with the fleet.

After the conclusion of the First English Civil War, Thomas Brooks became minister at Thomas Apostle's, London, and was sufficiently renowned for being chosen as preacher before the House of Commons on 26 December 1648. His sermon was afterward published under the title, 'God's Delight in the Progress of the Upright', the text being Psalm 44:18: 'Our heart is not turned  back, neither have our steps declined from Thy way'. Three or four years afterward, he transferred to St. Margaret's, Fish-street Hill, London.

As a writer C. H. Spurgeon said of him, 'Brooks scatters stars with both hands, with an eagle eye of faith as well as the eagle eye of imagination'.

In 1662, he fell victim to the Act of Uniformity, but he appears to have remained in his parish and preached as the opportunity arose.  Treatises continued to flow from his pen.

Works 

 Precious Remedies Against Satan's Devices, Banner of Truth Trust, Edinburgh (Puritan Paperbacks), first published 1652, 
 The Secret Key to Heaven: The Vital Importance of Private Prayer, Banner of Truth Trust, Edinburgh (Puritan Paperbacks), first published as 'The Privie Key of Heaven' 1665, 
 Heaven on Earth: A Treatise on Christian Assurance, Banner of Truth Trust (Puritan Paperbacks), first published 1654, 
 A Mute Christian Under the Rod by Thomas Brooks, Old Paths Gospel Press, Choteau, MT USA
 The Works of Thomas Brooks, Banner of Truth Trust, 
 Smooth Stones taken from Ancient Brooks, by Thomas Brooks and C.H. Spurgeon, Banner of Truth Trust,

References

External links 

 Works of Thomas Brooks, Vol. 1, Nichol's Series of Standard Divines, Puritan Period, with General Preface by John C. Miller, D.D.; Rev. Thomas Smith, General Editor, Edinburgh, James Nichol, 1866. Titles include: Grosart's Memoir of Brooks; Precious Remedies Against Satan's Devices; The Mute Christian Under The Smarting Rod; A String of Pearls
 Works of Thomas Brooks, Vol. 2, Nichol's Series of Standard Divines, Puritan Period, with General Preface by John C. Miller, D.D.; Rev. Thomas Smith, General Editor, Edinburgh, James Nichol, 1866.  Titles include: An Ark for All God's Noahs; The Privy Key of Heaven; Heaven On Earth
 Works of Thomas Brooks, Vol. 3, Nichol's Series of Standard Divines, Puritan Period, with General Preface by John C. Miller, D.D.; Rev. Thomas Smith, General Editor, Edinburgh, James Nichol, 1866.  Titles include: The Unsearchable Riches of Christ; A Cabinet of Jewels
 Works of Thomas Brooks, Vol. 4, Nichol's Series of Standard Divines, Puritan Period, with General Preface by John C. Miller, D.D.; Rev. Thomas Smith, General Editor, Edinburgh, James Nichol, 1866.  Titles include: The Crown and Glory of Christianity
 Works of Thomas Brooks, Vol. 5, Nichol's Series of Standard Divines, Puritan Period, with General Preface by John C. Miller, D.D.; Rev. Thomas Smith, General Editor, Edinburgh, James Nichol, 1866.  Titles include: The Golden Key to Open Hidden Treasures
 Works of Thomas Brooks, Vol. 6, Nichol's Series of Standard Divines, Puritan Period, with General Preface by John C. Miller, D.D.; Rev. Thomas Smith, General Editor, Edinburgh, James Nichol, 1866.  Titles include: London's Lamentations; The Glorious Day of the Saints' Appearance; God's Delight in the Progress of the Upright; Hypocrites Detected; A Believer's Last Day His Best Day; A Heavenly Cordial; The Legacy of a Dying Mother
 Smooth Stones Taken from Ancient Brooks  by Rev. C.H. Spurgeon of the New Park Street Chapel, Southwark - Being a collection of sentences, illustrations, and quaint sayings, from the works of that renowned Puritan, Thomas Brooks, Published by Sheldon & Company, New York, 1860
Thomas Brooks (1608-1680) (Biography) Excerpt from Meet the Puritans by Dr. Joel Beeke and Randall J. Pederson

1608 births
1680 deaths
English Calvinist and Reformed theologians
English evangelicals
Ejected English ministers of 1662
Alumni of Emmanuel College, Cambridge
17th-century Calvinist and Reformed theologians
17th-century English Anglican priests